Riikka Purra (born 13 June 1977) is a Finnish politician currently serving in the Parliament of Finland for the Finns Party for the Uusimaa constituency. In August 2021, she was elected the new leader of the party after Jussi Halla-aho.

Political career 
In 2016, Purra joined the Finns Party as a political planner. She served as a campaign manager for the presidential candidate Laura Huhtasaari in the 2018 Finnish presidential election. 

She was elected as a Member of Parliament from the constituency of Uusimaa in the June 2019 election with 5,960 votes and became the first deputy leader of the Finns party.

In March 2021, she criticised the government of overspending when it formed a three billion euro support package for municipalities during the COVID-19 pandemic in Finland.

In July 2021, Purra announced she would be running for the Finns Party leadership, aiming to become the first woman to lead the party. She declared that the party would never participate in a government where it would not be able to significantly change Finnish immigration policy. She was elected leader of the party on August 14, 2021, at the party meeting in Seinäjoki.

Personal life  
Purra is married and has two children. She tells her views on immigration were affected after she was sexually harassed in her early teens living in Tampere by persons with a refugee background. She became interested in immigration policy when she read Jussi Halla-aho's blog Scripta and participated in discussions on internet forums.

Purra has a master's degree in political science and she is completing her PhD studies on international politics at the University of Turku. She worked as a teacher and researcher before entering politics.

References

1977 births
Living people
People from Pirkkala
Leaders of the Finns Party
Members of the Parliament of Finland (2019–23)
21st-century Finnish women politicians
Women members of the Parliament of Finland

External links 
 Riikka Purra's personal website